The term pípa may refer to any of the following:

 Pipa (琵琶)
 Loquat (枇杷)
 Pipe (disambiguation)